James Pier Mason (February 3, 1889 – November 7, 1959) was an American actor. He appeared in more than 170 films between 1914 and 1952, often as a villain or henchman in Westerns, and was sometimes credited as Jim Mason. A memorable performance was in 1920's The Penalty as the drug-addicted criminal who shoots Lon Chaney's character Blizzard in the final moments of the film.

Biography 

He was born in Paris, France, on February 3, 1889 to James Kent Mason and Katie Evelyn Pier. His parents were from Manhattan, New York City and returned to the United States after his birth. Mason died in Hollywood, California, from a heart attack on November 7, 1959.

Selected filmography

References

External links 

 

1889 births
1959 deaths
American male film actors
American male silent film actors
20th-century American male actors
Male Western (genre) film actors
American expatriates in France
Male actors from Paris